Tetragimyia minor is a species of fly in the family Tachinidae, the only species in the genus Tetragimyia.

References

Tachinidae
Brachycera genera
Monotypic Brachycera genera
Arthropods of Japan